The 1904 New Hampshire gubernatorial election was held on November 8, 1904. Republican nominee John McLane defeated Democratic nominee Henry F. Hollis with 57.83% of the vote.

General election

Candidates
Major party candidates
John McLane, Republican
Henry F. Hollis, Democratic

Other candidates
Sumner F. Claflin, Socialist
David Heald, Prohibition
George Howie, People's

Results

References

1904
New Hampshire
Gubernatorial